Ademi is a surname. People with this surname include:

 Abdylaqim Ademi (1969–2018), Macedonian politician
 Albion Ademi (born 1999), Finnish footballer
 Allmir Ademi (born 1984), Swiss footballer
 Arijan Ademi (born 1991), Croatian footballer
 Kemal Ademi (born 1996), Swiss footballer
 Lorik Ademi (born 2001), Swedish footballer
 Melinda Ademi (born 1995), Albanian-American rapper, singer and songwriter
 Orhan Ademi (born 1991), Swiss footballer
 Rahim Ademi (born 1954), Croatian soldier
 Vedat Ademi (born 1982), Albanian Kosovar singer-songwriter